Andrey Ermakov, (born May 27, 1987) is a Russian ballet dancer, a winner of 'Soul of Dance' award (Russian 'Ballet' magazine, 2013), who performs as a principal with the Mariinsky Ballet (formerly the Kirov Ballet).

Biography 

Andrey Ermakov was born in Leningrad into a family of workers; at present his mother is an entrepreneur and his father is a shipwright. Ermakov began his professional training at the  age of 10 when he entered Vaganova Academy of Russian Ballet in Saint Petersburg, where he was tutored by Evgeny Scherbakov, Vitaly Tsvetkov and others.
  
Upon his graduation from  the Academy  in 2005, he was invited by three Saint Petersburg theatres to join. He chose to join the Mariinsky ballet. In the Mariinsky he has been coached by  professor Gennady Selutsky, a former ballet dancer, renowned ballet professional,  Honored Art Worker of Russian Federation.

During his first years at Mariinsky he appeared as soloist in the premiere of Peter Quanz's ballet Aria Suspended to Igor Stravinsky's music of Symphony in C dedicated to 125th anniversary of the composer, and in George Balanchine's La Valse; he also toured with the Mariinsky Ballet Company to Great Britain, Germany, France, Italy, Spain, the USA, Israel, Japan, China, Thailand and Taiwan.

Then he began appearing as Vaslav in The Fountain of Bakhchisarai, and after that other leading parts followed - in George Balanchine's  Serenade, Emeralds etc. At the age of 20 he danced Ali in Le Corsaire, one of the most technically and emotionally demanding  male ballet parts. Later Ermakov added many principal male ballet parts to his wide repertoire and now performs not only with Mariinsky, his home ballet company, but also takes part in ballet galas and performances with other troupes as a guest artist.

Ermakov is very convincing in heroic, romantic or dramatic ballet roles, both in classical and modern repertoire. His dancing is known for characterization, rare manly athleticism, elegance, virtuosity, great stage presence, technical strength and purity of the great Vaganova style.

For several years Ermakov was a steady ballet partner of People's Artist of Russia, prima-ballerina Ulyana Lopatkina. As Lopatkina's partner he took part  in  a series of Gala Concerts "Ulyana Lopatkina and stars" and in "Anna Karenina", a two-act ballet choreographed by Alexei Ratmansky to Rodion Shchedrin's music, starring Ulyana Lopatkina as Karenina, Ermakov as Count Vronsky and Victor Baranov as Karenin filmed by Telmondis (France) for Mezzo TV. November 28, 2014 saw the premiere of "Anna Karenina" on Mezzo TV. Valery Gergiev conducted.

In January 2018 Ermakov acquired a status of individual entrepreneur  and opened up a car service. As of May, 2020 Ermakov's car service has been out of business.

Personal life 
 Since autumn of 2016 Ermakov has been in a relationship with  Veronika Akhmadieva, a singer, a very engaging contemporary dancer and a small entrepreneur, 4 years his senior, divorced, childless.

Awards 

 'Soul of Dance' award (Russian 'Ballet' magazine, 2013, 'Rising Star' category)

Repertoire at the Mariinsky Theatre

Filmography 
 "Willow (Palm) Sunday", RWS – Санкт-Петербург, 2009.
 "Three centuries of Saint Petersburg ballet". Ballet gala. Россия К, 2012.
 "Swan lake" in 3D.  Swan Lake 3D - Live from the Mariinsky Theatre. Cameron Pace Group, 2013.
 "Tango-gala", "Россия К", 2013.
 "Ouliana Lopatkina, une étoile russe". Marlène Ionesco for Mezzo TV, 2014.
 Anna Karenina, Alexei Ratmansky's ballet to Rodion Schedrin's music. Telmondis and Mariinsky theatre for Mezzo TV, 2014.
 "Ave Майя" Ballet gala at Bolshoi theatre dedicated to the 90th anniversary of Maya Plisetskaya. November 20, 2015, "Россия К"  channel.

References

External links 
 Andrey Ermakov on the site of Mariinsky Theatre.
 Firebird/ Marguerite and Armand/ Concerto DSCH, Mariinsky Ballet, Royal Opera House A review by Ismene Brown about Mariinsky ballet tour at Royal Opera House, August 2014.
 Andrey Ermakov Big Ballet: this is a chance to give your talent to the wide audience. An exclusive interview for "Россия К" Russian TV channel.
 To be yourself An interview for Antre Magazine, 2014, № 3 (in Russian)
  Ballet critic Igor Stupnikov reviews Andrey Ermakov's career. Ballet Magazine, 2014, № 2. (In Russian).
  Andrey Ermakov: I just live on the stage. Exclusive interview for China Ballet Magazine. November, 2015 at Beijing. In English.

Video 
 Andrey Ermakov for "Россия К" TV channel, September, 2012.
  Adagio and variations from the ballet Shurale - Maria Shirinkina and Andrey Ermakov in a Gala dedicated to R. Abdyev, March 31, 2013. Video by Mariinsky theatre.
 Andrey Ermakov in V. Vernik's "Who's there" ("Кто там?") show on "Россия К" TV channel

Mariinsky Ballet dancers
Russian male ballet dancers
1987 births
Living people